Die Model WG (German for The Model Community) is a German reality television documentary series which claims to follow the life of aspiring models that are living together in one loft, with most of them being former contestants on Germany's Next Topmodel. It is the German adaptation of the 2009 Austrian series of the same title, which itself was based on the 2008 American television series Modelville. The German Die Model WG aired on Pro Sieben from 14 January to 27 February 2010.

GNTM-judge and model agent Peyman Amin is the mentor of the models and responsible for organizing castings and booking for them. Therefore, he equals the role of a model agent during the girls stay in the apartment. Starting with six girls, the show saw several girls voluntary leaving the apartment and therefore the show over the course of the episodes with a new girl moving in as the replacement. The winner of the show was to move to "Model-WG" in New York.

Contestants
(ages stated are at time of contest)

Weekly performances

 The contestant won the competition
 The contestant was booked for a job
 The contestant was booked for two or more jobs
 The contestant left the competition

Episodes 3 and 6 did not have eliminations.
In Episode 7, the top 3 was revealed before the winner was announced.

Controversies
While the show was filmed, a fight between two contestants of the show (Tessa and Sarah) became the subject of several tabloid magazines where one was supposed to have attacked the other one with a pan in front of the cameras. So Tessa had to leave the show in the fifth week.

References

2010 German television series debuts
2010 German television series endings
German-language television shows
Germany's Next Topmodel
German reality television series
ProSieben original programming